Norman Adolphus Evill FRIBA (1873 – 5 August 1958) was an English architect and draughtsman, apprenticed to Edwin Lutyens.

Life and works
Evill was born in the village of Hewelsfield, Gloucestershire, in 1873. His father, Walter, was also an architect, who undertook much work in the nearby town of Chepstow. Evill was apprenticed to Edwin Lutyens as a draughtsman in 1899, later recording that he observed, and tried to learn, Lutyens' ability to see "in the round". Evill worked at Lutyens' office in Bloomsbury Square for three years.

Establishing his own architectural and drawing practice in the early 20th century, Evill undertook a range of work, often restorations and re-buildings, rather than entirely new works. These include the re-building and extension of Nymans Manor in West Sussex, although Evill was replaced by Walter Tapper after a disagreement with the owner, Leonard Messel. Clive Aslet, the architectural writer, describes the combined result as "a Victorian house transformed into a medieval romance". Evill also built a row of cottages on the Nymans estate. Other works in the South of England included a garden house, and internal refurbishment, at Bratton, Wiltshire, and classrooms and a chapel at Ashdown House School, East Sussex, where his cousin was headmaster. For the inhabitants of the Hampshire village of Silchester, he designed a village hall which was redeveloped in the early 21st century. He undertook other work in Silchester, including large extensions to Silchester House, and two smaller houses, the Grange and High Timbers, now Romans Hotel. Bullen, Crook, Hubbuck and Pevsner, in their Hampshire: Winchester and the North volume of the Buildings of England series, describe Romans as being "in his master's Surrey style". In London, Evill restored Park House at Hampton Court Palace, and undertook the conversion of a coach house in the garden of his own home on Church Row, Hampstead. Renamed 24 Perrins Walk, the coach house later became the home of the comedian Peter Cook. 

Work in the West and Wales included the reconstruction of Shirenewton Hall in Monmouthshire, and a house, Ivy Rock, at Tidenham, Gloucestershire. In the North, Nevill built Barn Close, Carlisle for the architect and industrialist Edwin Scott-Nicholson. Hyde and Pevsner, in their Cumbria volume of the Buildings of England, note the Arts and Crafts design of the house, a style that Evill favoured.

Evill died in 1958.

Notes

References

Sources
 
 
   
 
 
 
 

1873 births
1958 deaths
Fellows of the Royal Institute of British Architects
20th-century English architects
People from Forest of Dean District
Arts and Crafts architects